The Criminals is a 1962 Australian TV movie. Australian TV drama was relatively rare at the time.

Plot
In London, a cracksman helps people in a firm help him with a robbery. Four men people are trapped after a robbery.

Cast
Ken Goodlet as Dorell
Alexander Archdale as Crawford
Richard Davies
Lou Vernon as the nightwatchman

Production
It was Henri Safran's last play before he left for a six-month overseas tour. The production was shot in Sydney.

Reception
The Bulletin said it was "no Rififi  but   it   was   fairly   good   television   drama,  with   a   solid   performance   by   Ken   Goodlet." The Woman's Weekly called it "well produced".

See also
List of television plays broadcast on Australian Broadcasting Corporation (1960s)

References

External links

1962 television plays
Australian television plays
Australian Broadcasting Corporation original programming
Black-and-white Australian television shows
English-language television shows